Unión Deportiva Mahón is a Spanish football team based in Mahón, Menorca, in the autonomous community of the Balearic Islands. Founded in 1922, they currently play in Regional Preferente de Menorca, holding home matches at the Campo de San Carlo, with a capacity of 4,520 people.

History

Club background
Unió Sportiva Mahón – (1922–1940)
Unión Deportiva Mahón – (1940–present)

Season to season

20 seasons in Tercera División

References

External links
  

Football clubs in the Balearic Islands
Sport in Menorca
Association football clubs established in 1922
1922 establishments in Spain